The Mora National Fish Hatchery and Technology Center is one of seven federal fish hatchery technology centers in the United States.  Located in Mora County, New Mexico, on State Route 434 (milepost 1.5),  it is mainly involved in the restoration and recovery of the threatened Gila trout, a fish found only in the upper headwaters of the Gila River in New Mexico and Arizona. . Formal cooperative agreements between the U.S. Fish and Wildlife Service and New Mexico Game and Fish call for the Mora hatchery to also establish a brood stock of Rio Grande cutthroat trout and provide fish culture training to other biologists.  The Mora hatchery also works to conserve the bonytail chub. The hatchery accepts a limited number of volunteers to assist in conservation activities.

Gila trout
Scientists at the Mora hatchery keep brood stocks of the Gila trout, maintaining them in as natural a setting as possible. They keep the Gila trout in tanks with woody cover, current flow, and with other fishes that naturally associate in the wild, like the desert and Sonoran sucker. Culturing fish in as natural an environment as possible is intended to maintain wild characteristics so that the offspring are well-suited to face the rigors of the wild.

Elaborate quarantine procedures have been established to prevent the spread of disease to the rare brood stocks from fish brought in from the wild and from other hatcheries.  Of particular concern is whirling disease.

Water recirculation system
In 2000, the Mora fish hatchery installed an award-winning, leading-edge water recirculation system that allows the Mora facility to recirculate up to 95 percent of its water.

Notes

External links
 "Mora National Fish Hatchery & Technology Center"
 Springer, Craig (27 September 2006) "Gila trout down-listed to threatened status" Fishing World

National Fish Hatcheries of the United States
Buildings and structures in Mora County, New Mexico
Tourist attractions in Mora County, New Mexico
Agricultural buildings and structures in New Mexico